Pseudoplesiops is a  genus of dottyback fishes currently with ten described species. They are distributed in the south Pacific and in the Indian Ocean as far west as the Maldive Islands.

Species
Pseudoplesiops annae (Weber, 1913) (Anna's dottyback) 
Pseudoplesiops collare A.C. Gill, Randall & Edwards, 1991 (Collared dottyback)
Pseudoplesiops howensis Allen, 1987 (Lord Howe dottyback)
Pseudoplesiops immaculatusA.C. Gill & Edwards, 2002 (Immaculate dottyback) 
Pseudoplesiops occidentalis A.C. Gill & Edwards, 2002 
Pseudoplesiops revellei Schultz, 1953 (Bearded Dottyback)
Pseudoplesiops rosae Schultz, 1943 (Rose Island Basslet)
Pseudoplesiops typus Bleeker, 1858  (Hidden Basslet)
Pseudoplesiops wassi A.C. Gill & Edwards, 2003 (Fleckfin Dottyback)

References
Fishbase entry for Pseudoplesiops
Pseudoplesiops wassi, a new species of dottyback fish (Teleostei: Pseudochromidae: Pseudoplesiopinae) from the West Pacific A.C. GILL  & A.J. EDWARDS

 Pseudoplesiopinae
Marine fish genera
Taxa named by Pieter Bleeker